Ailingen is the largest ortschaft (urban locality) of Friedrichshafen, Germany.

History

The place was first mentioned in documents in 771, as "villa Ailingas."

References

Bodenseekreis